Sarah Bowdich Lee (née Wallis) (10 September 1791 – 22 September 1856) was an English author, illustrator, traveller, zoologist, botanist, and pteridologist.

Information
Sarah Lee was born on 10 September 1791, the only daughter of John Eglinton Wallis of Colchester.

In 1813, she married the naturalist Thomas Edward Bowdich, whose interests in nature, travel, and adventure she shared.

In 1819, they went to Paris to visit Baron Cuvier; Thomas had previously visited him in 1818 with a letter of introduction obtained from Dr. William Elford Leach of the British Museum. 
They spent most of the next four years in Paris studying his collections.

In 1823, on their final trip to Africa, they visited Madeira on their way, but her husband died on the Gambia River on 10 January 1824.

Left with three children, she struggled to support her family as an author. Early in her widowhood, Mrs  Bowdich often visited Baron Cuvier in Paris, where he treated her almost like a daughter; upon his death in 1832, she wrote a memoir of his life.

In 1826, she married Robert Lee and in subsequent years published under the name Mrs. Robert Lee.

In 1854, she was granted a civil list pension of £50 per year. In 1856, she died at Erith while visiting her daughter Eugenia.

Of her numerous works, perhaps the four most important are Taxidermy (1820) an exhaustive treatment which came to a sixth edition in 1843; Excursions in Madeira and Porto Santo (1825), a work of natural history; The Fresh-Water Fishes of Great Britain (1825), illustrated by the author; and Memoirs of Baron Cuvier (1833).

Selected publications
 1844. Elements of Natural History, for the use of schools and young persons: comprising the principles of classification, interspersed with ... account of the most remarkable animals ... Illustrated
 1850. Elements of Natural History, for the use of schools and young persons: comprising the principles of classification, interspersed with ... account of the most remarkable animals ... Illustrated
 1851. Adventures in Australia: or, the Wanderings of Captain Spencer in the bush and the wilds ... With illustrations by J.S. Prout. xi, [1], 364 pp., 18 pl. 
 1852a. British Birds, with descriptions by Mrs. R. Lee ... and seven pictures from drawings by Harrison Weir  
 1852b The Farm and its Scenes, with descriptions by Mrs. R. Lee ... and six pictures from drawings by Harrison Weir 
 1853a. Foreign Animals, with descriptions by Mrs. R. Lee ... and seven pictures from drawings by Harrison Weir
 1853b. Anecdotes of the Habits and Instincts of Birds, Reptiles, and Fishes ... With illustrations by Harrison Weir
 1853c. Familiar Natural History, with descriptions by Mrs. R. Lee ... and ... illustrations from drawings by Harrison Weir
 1854. Trees, Plants, and Flowers: their beauties, uses, and influences ... The illustrations ... by James Andrews
 1867. The African wanderers ... Fourth edition
 Foreign Birds, with descriptions by Mrs. R. Lee ... and seven pictures from drawings by Harrison Weir
 Taxidermy: or, the art of collecting, preparing, and mounting objects of natural history
 British Animals, with descriptions by Mrs. R. Lee ... and seven pictures from drawings by Harrison Weir

Taxon described by her
See :Category:Taxa named by Sarah Bowdich Lee

Notes

Attribution

References
 
 Desmond, R. 1994. Dictionary of British & Irish Botanists & Horticulturists including Plant Collectors, Flower Painters & Garden Designers. Taylor & Francis & The Natural History Museum, London.

External links

 
 
 Memoirs of Baron Cuvier by Mrs. R. Lee, 1833, (London: Longman)

1791 births
1856 deaths
English non-fiction writers
English naturalists
English botanists